Ajay Kumar Singh (born 2 March 1970) is an Indian politician and a member of 17th Legislative Assembly of Uttar Pradesh of India. He represents the Harraiya (Assembly constituency) in the Basti district of Uttar Pradesh and is a member of the Bharatiya Janata Party.

Early life and education
Singh was born 2 March 1970 in Basti district of Uttar Pradesh to father Narendra Bahadur Singh. He received MBA and LLB degrees from University of Lucknow. On 3 February 2003, he married Sunita Singh, with whom he has a son and a daughter. Singh is an Advocate by profession.

Political career
Singh started his career in politics in 17th Legislative Assembly of Uttar Pradesh (2017) elections, he contested from Harraiya (Assembly constituency) against Raj Kishor Singh, who is regular three time MLA from this constituency and Cabinet minister in Akhilesh Yadav ministry. However he defeated Samajwadi Party candidate Raj Kishor Singh by a margin of 30,106 votes.

Posts held

References

Uttar Pradesh MLAs 2017–2022
Bharatiya Janata Party politicians from Uttar Pradesh
Living people
People from Basti district
1970 births
Uttar Pradesh MLAs 2022–2027